This is a bibliography of works with information or interpretations of the life and teachings of Jesus. The list is grouped by date, and sorted within each group (except for the very earliest works) alphabetically by name of author.

Jesus of Nazareth (7–2 BC/BCE to 30–36 AD/CE), commonly referred to as Jesus Christ or simply as Jesus or Christ, is the central figure of Christianity. Most Christian denominations

venerate him as God the Son incarnated and believe that he rose from the dead after being crucified.
The principal sources of information regarding Jesus are the four canonical gospels. Note that this list does not contain important books about Jesus pertaining to Islam, the Church of Jesus Christ of Latter-day Saints, Bahá'í, or several other significant faiths.

1st and 2nd centuries 
The New Testament of the Bible, especially the Gospels (see List of Gospels). Editions include The Greek New Testament, Aland, United Bible Societies.
The Nag Hammadi Library
The Diatessaron by Tatian, a harmonisation of the four canonical Gospels.
 
 1st edition 1890, translated and edited by Lightfoot, J. B.; 1891, revised by Harmer, J. R.
Josephus, Antiquities of the Jews 18.63-64 (18.3.3 in the numbering system of older editions). The authenticity of this passage is disputed.

7th century 

 The Quran, especially chapters 3 through 5 and 19.

17th century 
  Link to online text in Wikipedia article.

18th century 
  First French edition 1798, abridged from a 12-volume work of 1795.
  The English title does not correspond to that of any work by Reimarius in either German or English Wikipedia.
  Original French publication 1791.

19th century 
 The Book of Mormon, especially Third Nephi.
Doctrine and Covenants

 
 
 
  Original Russian publication 1887.
 
  Original German publication 183536.
  Original German publication 1864.
  Original German publication 1865.
 , Wikipedia article The Kingdom of God is Within You. Original Russian publication 1894.
  Written by a founder of the Seventh-day Adventist Church. Link to online text in main Wikipedia article.

20th century

19011950 
 
 
  The main Wikipedia article contains links to the online text.
  Link to online text in Wikipedia article.
 
 
 
 
 
 
  A book on Christianity and logical support for Jesus as God, from an Anglo-Catholic perspective.
 
 Pyle, Howard (1903), Rejected of Men:  A Story of To-day, New York:  Harper.  A novel about Jesus' coming to early twentieth century America.
 
 
 
  Main Wikipedia article Jesus the Christ (book).
  Link to online text in the main Wikipedia article.

19512000 
 
 
 
 
 
 
 
 
 
 
 
  Bultmann was a prominent figure in early 20th century historical Jesus research.
 
 
 
 
  Crossan is a prominent figure in contemporary historical Jesus research.
 
 
  Dibelius a prominent figure in 20th century historical Jesus research. 
 
 
 
 
 
  Original Spanish publication 1976.
 
 
 
  Funk was an expert on parables, and Crossan (a founding member of the Jesus Seminar) is a major figure in contemporary historical Jesus research. Crossan promotes the view that Jesus was more of a Cynic sage, an important current viewpoint but secondary to the view that he was an apocalyptic prophet.
 
 
 
 
 
  Käsemann is a prominent figure in historical Jesus research.
 
 
 
 
 
 
 
  Volumes 3 and 4: 21st century.
  A study of the earliest traditions of Israel from linguistic and archaeological evidence which treats the teachings and followers of Jesus in that context.
  Italian title, Ipotesi su Gesù (1976). A book which initially explores the question of Jesus from two secular points of view, mythical (Jesus never lived) and critical (Jesus was not God), and finally considers a third hypothesis - faith.
 
 
 
 
 
 
  A novel.
 
  Employs evolutionary anthropology.
  A specialist book, but not inaccessible.
  An up-to-date, popular, but thoroughly scholarly book. Sanders is a prominent figure in contemporary historical Jesus research.
 
 
 
 
 
 
 
  An amazing book, tough but rewarding, exceptionally detailed.
 
 
 
 
  Vermes is a prominent figure in contemporary historical Jesus research.
 
 
  Official doctrine of the Jehovah's Witnesses.
 
 
 
 
 
 
Wilson, A. N., Jesus: A Life  (1992)
 
 
  Original German publication 1901. Wrede was a prominent figure in early 20th century historical Jesus research.
  The second in a projected five or six volume series on Christian origins, dealing with the life and death of Christ from a very open evangelical perspective.

21st century 
Shmuley Boteach (2012), Kosher Jesus, Gefen Publishing House, .
The Life and Death of the Radical Historical Jesus, David Burns, 2013, Oxford University Press.
 A New Sensation by Jesus Christ, Beth Cook and Laurie Stimpson April 21, 2014 
 
 
 
 
 
 
 
 
 
 
 
 
 
 
 
 
 Jordan Anthony J. Title A Jesus biography 2015.  September 2015.    westportbooks@yahoo.co.uk

  A Gnostic view of His relationship with Mary Magdalene as well as His ministry.
 
  Volumes 1 and 2: 20th century.
 
  A less technical study than The Tenth Generation of the earliest traditions of Israel from linguistic and archaeological evidence which also treats the teachings and followers of Jesus in that context.
 
 
 
 
 
 
 
 
 
 
 
 
 
 
 
  Original Dutch publication 2007.

Unknown date 
  Not before 1988, the date of foundation of Fortress Press. No further bibliographical information found online.

Jesus as different from Paul the Apostle

Jesus Married?

See also
Cultural depictions of Jesus

External links
 The Four in One Gospel of Jesus

References

Christian bibliographies
Jesus
Books about Jesus